Beris chalybata, the murky-legged black legionnaire, is a European (Northern and middle Europe from
the northern Sweden down into France. European Russia) species of soldier fly.

Description
Length 5,5—5,8 mm.
Male. Eyes hairy, the facets in the upper part slightly larger than below, the dividing line slightly conspicuous. Antennae black, short, shorter than the head: the annulated part short and stubby. Thorax dark metallic green, with blackish brown and longish pubescence. Abdomen dull black with blackish pubescence (long at the margin). Venter brownish black, shining. Legs yellow; coxae brownish black; tarsi, except the bases, brownish black: hind metatarsi yellow, much thickened; the four last joints of the hind tarsi are also slightly dilated. Legs with fine yellowish pubescence. Wings considerably brownish with brownish veins, stigma not conspicuous. Halteres blackish brown.

Female. Fronsin the female broad, occupying the third part of the breadth of the head. Eyes sparingly and short hairy. Front broad, black. Thorax more greenish or bluish than in the male, with short, pale brown pubescence. Abdomen dark brown, shining. Wings not brown but distinctly yellowish, with light brown veins, stigma brown. Halteres yellow.

Biology
The habitat is moist or shaded locations with trees and hedgerows. Adults are found from April 
to September. The saproxylic larvae found in decaying dead leaves and wood debris.

References

Stratiomyidae
Diptera of Europe
Insects described in 1771
Taxa named by Johann Reinhold Forster